Daddy Fresh is a veteran Nigerian reggae singer from Abia state and born in Lagos state Nigeria, Daddy Fresh started his musical career professionally in  the mid-1980s. He was the founding member, leader, lead vocalist and songwriter, of the group “DE Pretty Busy Boys” which comprises Daddy Showkey Cashman Davies and Sexy Pretty. He became famous in the late 1990s all over Nigeria. During this time, he was honored as the, "King of the Ajegunle Musicians" for his innovation of a music genre known as galala or ghetto music. Ghetto music's development was not entirely his own, as it was also influenced by the work of Daddy Showkey and Baba Fryo.

His songs "Elerugbe erue", "Faka Fiki faka" and "Fiji fa" sold over 300 thousand units in Lagos state. Later, over 1 million of his songs were sold illegally by pirates at  Alaba International Market.

In 2017, he once advised the new generation artiste that their songs should not always be about "whine your waist" and they should also avoid repetition of words and try to sing songs that would impact positively on the nation's economy.

References

External links
  Daddy Fresh at discogs.com
 Daddy Fresh's  official channel

21st-century Nigerian male singers
Living people
Place of birth missing (living people)
1971 births
20th-century Nigerian male singers